Faena may refer to 
A term in Spanish-style bullfighting
Faena Arts Center, in Buenos Aires, Argentina
Faena Hotel Buenos Aires
Alan Faena (born 1963), Argentine hotelier and real estate developer
Sebastian Faena (born 1990), Argentine filmmaker and fashion photographer